The concept of God in Hinduism varies in its diverse traditions. Hinduism spans a wide range of beliefs such as henotheism, monotheism, polytheism, panentheism, pantheism, pandeism, monism, agnosticism, atheism, and nontheism.

Forms of theism find mention in the Bhagavad Gita. Emotional or loving devotion (bhakti) to a primary god such as avatars of Vishnu (Krishna for example), Shiva and Devi (as emerged in the early medieval period ) is now known as Bhakti movement.

Contemporary Hinduism can be categorized into four major traditions: Vaishnavism, Shaivism, Shaktism, and Smartism. Vaishnavism, Shaivism, and Shaktism worship Vishnu, Shiva, and Devi — the Divine Mother — as the Supreme respectively, or consider all Hindu deities as aspects of the formless Supreme Reality or Brahman. Other minor sects such as Ganapatya and Saura focus on Ganesha and Surya as the Supreme.

Hindus following Advaita Vedanta consider Ātman within every living being to be the same as Vishnu or Shiva or Devi, or alternatively identical to the eternal metaphysical Absolute, called Brahman in Hinduism. Such a philosophical system of Advaita or non-dualism as it developed in the Vedanta school of Hindu philosophy, especially as set out in the Upanishads and popularised by Adi Shankara in the 8th century has been influential on Hinduism.

Hindus following Dvaita Vedanta consider that the individual Self, known as jīvātmans, and the eternal metaphysical Absolute called Brahman in Hinduism exist as independent realities, and that these are distinct. Such a philosophical system of Dvaita or dualism as it developed in the Vedanta school of Hindu philosophy, especially as set out in the Vedas and popularised by Madhvacharya in the 13th century has been influential on Hinduism. Especially the influence of Madhva's philosophy has been most prominent and pronounced on the Chaitanya school of Bengal Vaishnavism. Madhva says that in the beginning there was only one God and that was Narayana or Vishnu and refused to accept any claims that other Hindu deities, such as Brahma or Shiva, might be equally the highest.

Henotheism, kathenotheism, and equitheism 

 was the term used by scholars such as Max Müller to describe the theology of Vedic religion. Müller noted that the hymns of the Rigveda, the oldest scripture of Hinduism, mention many deities, but praises them successively as the "one ultimate, supreme God" (called sachidananda in some beliefs), alternatively as "one supreme Goddess", thereby asserting that the essence of the deities was unitary (ekam), and the deities were nothing but pluralistic manifestations of the same concept of the divine (God).

The idea that there can be and are plural perspectives for the same divine or spiritual principle repeats in the Vedic texts. For example, other than hymn 1.164 with this teaching, the more ancient hymn 5.3 of the Rigveda states:

Related terms to henotheism are monolatrism and kathenotheism. Henotheism refers to a pluralistic theology wherein different deities are viewed to be of a unitary, equivalent divine essence. Some scholars prefer the term monolatry to henotheism, to discuss religions where a single god is central, but the existence or the position of other gods is not denied. Another term related to henotheism is "equitheism", referring to the belief that all gods are equal.

Panentheism and non-theism 
The Vedic era conceptualization of the divine or the One, states Jeaneane Fowler, is more abstract than a monotheistic God, it is the Reality behind and of the phenomenal universe. The Vedic hymns treat it as "limitless, indescribable, absolute principle", thus the Vedic divine is something of a panentheism rather than simple henotheism.

In late Vedic era, around the start of Upanishadic age, theosophical speculations emerge that develop concepts which scholars variously call nondualism or monism, as well as forms of non-theism and pantheism. An example of the questioning of the concept of God, in addition to henotheistic hymns found therein, are in later portions of the Rigveda, such as the Nasadiya Sukta.

Hinduism calls the metaphysical absolute concept as Brahman, incorporating within it the transcendent and immanent reality. Different schools of thought interpret Brahman as either personal, impersonal or transpersonal. Ishwar Chandra Sharma describes it as "Absolute Reality, beyond all dualities of existence and non-existence, light and darkness, and of time, space and cause".

Influential ancient and medieval Hindu philosophers, states philosophy professor Roy Perrett, teach their spiritual ideas with a world created ex nihilo and "effectively manage without God altogether". In Hindu philosophy, there are many different schools. Its non-theist traditions such as Samkhya, early Nyaya, Mimamsa and many within Vedanta such as Advaita do not posit the existence of an almighty, omnipotent, omniscient, omnibenevolent God (monotheistic God), while its theistic traditions posit a personal God left to the choice of the Hindu. The major schools of Hindu philosophy explain morality and the nature of existence through the karma and samsara doctrines, as in other Indian religions.

Monotheism 
Monotheism is the belief in a single creator God and the lack of belief in any other Creator. Hinduism is not a monolithic faith and different sects may or may not posit or require such a belief. Religion is considered a personal belief in Hinduism and followers are free to choose the different interpretations within the framework of karma and samsara. Many forms of Hinduism believe in a monotheistic God, such as Krishnaism, some schools of Vedanta, and Arya Samaj.

Madhvacharya's monotheistic God 
Madhvacharya (1238–1317 CE) developed the Dvaita theology wherein Vishnu was presented as a monotheistic God, similar to major world religions. His writings led some such as George Abraham Grierson to suggest he was influenced by Christianity.

Madhvacharya was misperceived and misrepresented by both Christian missionaries and Hindu writers during the colonial era scholarship. The similarities in the primacy of one God, dualism and distinction between man and God, devotion to God, the son of God as the intermediary, predestination, the role of grace in salvation, as well as the similarities in the legends of miracles in Christianity and Madhvacharya's Dvaita tradition fed these stories. Among Christian writers, G. A. Grierson creatively asserted that Madhva's ideas evidently were "borrowed from Christianity, quite possibly promulgated as a rival to the central doctrine of that faith". Among Hindu writers, according to Sarma, S. C. Vasu creatively translated Madhvacharya's works to identify Madhvacharya with Christ, rather than compare their ideas.

Modern scholarship rules out the influence of Christianity on Madhvacharya, as there is no evidence that there ever was a Christian settlement where Madhvacharya grew up and lived, or that there was a sharing or discussion of ideas between someone with knowledge of the Bible and Christian narratives, and him. Furthermore, many adherents consider the similarities to be superficial and insubstantial; for example, Madhvacharya postulates three co-eternal fundamental realities, consisting of Supreme Being (Vishnu or paramathma), individual Self (jīvātman), and inanimate matter.

Brahman

Many traditions within Hinduism share the Vedic idea of a metaphysical ultimate reality and truth called Brahman. According to Jan Gonda, Brahman denoted the  "power immanent in the sound, words, verses and formulas of Vedas" in the earliest Vedic texts. The early Vedic religious understanding of Brahman underwent a series of abstractions in the Hindu scriptures that followed the Vedic scriptures. These scriptures would reveal a vast body of insights into the nature of Brahman as originally revealed in the Vedas. These Hindu traditions that emerged from or identified with the Vedic scriptures and that maintained the notion of a metaphysical ultimate reality would identify that ultimate reality as Brahman. Hindu adherents to these traditions within Hinduism revere Hindu deities and, indeed, all of existence, as aspects of the Brahman. The deities in Hinduism are not considered to be almighty, omnipotent, omniscient and omnibenevolent, and spirituality is considered to be seeking the ultimate truth that is possible by a number of paths. Like other Indian religions, in Hinduism, deities are born, they live and they die in every kalpa (eon, cycle of existence).

In Hinduism, Brahman connotes the highest Universal Principle, the Ultimate Reality in the universe. In major schools of Hindu philosophy, it is the material, efficient, formal and final cause of all that exists. It is the pervasive, genderless, infinite, eternal truth and bliss which does not change, yet is the cause of all changes. Brahman as a metaphysical concept is the single binding unity behind the diversity in all that exists in the universe.

Brahman is a Vedic Sanskrit word, and it is conceptualized in Hinduism, states Paul Deussen, as the "creative principle which lies realized in the whole world". Brahman is a key concept found in the Vedas, and it is extensively discussed in the early Upanishads. The Vedas conceptualize Brahman as the Cosmic Principle. In the Upanishads, it has been variously described as Sat-cit-ānanda (truth-consciousness-bliss) and as the unchanging, permanent, highest reality.

Brahman is discussed in Hindu texts with the concept of Atman (Self), personal, impersonal or Para Brahman, or in various combinations of these qualities depending on the philosophical school. In dualistic schools of Hinduism such as the theistic Dvaita Vedanta, Brahman is different from Atman (Self) in each being, and therein it shares conceptual framework of God in major world religions. In non-dual schools of Hinduism such as the monist Advaita Vedanta, Brahman is identical to the Atman, Brahman is everywhere and inside each living being, and there is connected spiritual oneness in all existence.

The Upanishads contain several mahā-vākyas or "Great Sayings"  on the concept of Brahman:

Saguna and nirguna 

While Hinduism sub-schools such as Advaita Vedanta emphasize the complete equivalence of Brahman and Atman, they also expound on Brahman as saguna Brahman—the Brahman with attributes, and nirguna Brahman—the Brahman without attributes. The nirguna Brahman is the Brahman as it really is, however, the saguna Brahman is posited as a means to realizing nirguna Brahman, but the Hinduism schools declare saguna Brahman to be ultimately illusory. The concept of the saguna Brahman, such as in the form of avatars, is considered in these schools of Hinduism to be a useful symbolism, path and tool for those who are still on their spiritual journey, but the concept is finally cast aside by the fully enlightened.

The Bhakti movement of Hinduism built its theosophy around two concepts of Brahman—Nirguna and Saguna. Nirguna Brahman was the concept of the Ultimate Reality as formless, without attributes or quality. Saguna Brahman, in contrast, was envisioned and developed as with form, attributes and quality. The two had parallels in the ancient pantheistic unmanifest and theistic manifest traditions, respectively, and traceable to Arjuna-Krishna dialogue in the Bhagavad Gita. It is the same Brahman, but viewed from two perspectives: one from Nirguni knowledge-focus and other from Saguni love-focus, united as Krishna in the Gita. Nirguna bhakta's poetry were Jnana-shrayi, or had roots in knowledge. Saguna bhakta's poetry were Prema-shrayi, or with roots in love. In Bhakti, the emphasis is reciprocal love and devotion, where the devotee loves God, and God loves the devotee.

Nirguna and Saguna Brahman concepts of the Bhakti movement has been a baffling one to scholars, particularly the Nirguni tradition because it offers, states David Lorenzen, "heart-felt devotion to a God without attributes, without even any definable personality". Yet given the "mountains of Nirguni bhakti literature", adds Lorenzen, bhakti for Nirguna Brahman has been a part of the reality of the Hindu tradition along with the bhakti for Saguna Brahman. These were two alternate ways of imagining God during the bhakti movement.

Ishvara 

The Yogasutras of Patanjali use the term Ishvara in 11 verses: I.23 through I.29, II.1, II.2, II.32 and II.45. Ever since the Sutra's release, Hindu scholars have debated and commented on who or what is Isvara? These commentaries range from defining Isvara from a "personal god" to "special self" to "anything that has spiritual significance to the individual". Whicher explains that while Patanjali's terse verses can be interpreted both as theistic or non-theistic, Patanjali's concept of Isvara in Yoga philosophy functions as a "transformative catalyst or guide for aiding the yogin on the path to spiritual emancipation".

Patanjali defines Isvara (Sanskrit: ईश्वर) in verse 24 of Book 1, as "a special Self (पुरुषविशेष, puruṣa-viśeṣa)",

Sanskrit: 
– Yoga Sutras I.24

This sutra of Yoga philosophy of Hinduism adds the characteristics of Isvara as that special Self which is unaffected (अपरामृष्ट, aparamrsta) by one's obstacles/hardships (क्लेश, klesha), one's circumstances created by past or one's current actions (कर्म, karma), one's life fruits (विपाक, vipâka), and one's psychological dispositions/intentions (आशय, ashaya).

Among various Bhakti path practicing sects of Hinduism, which built upon the Yoga school of Hinduism, Isvara can also mean a specific deity such as Vishnu, Krishna, Rama, Shiva, Lakshmi, Parvati and others.

Svayam Bhagavan 

Svayam Bhagavan, a Sanskrit theological term, is the concept of absolute representation of the monotheistic God as Bhagavan himself within Hinduism. The theological interpretation of  differs with each tradition and the translated from the Sanskrit language, the term literary means "Bhagavan Himself" or "directly Bhagavan." Earlier commentators such as Madhvacharya translated the term Svayam Bhagavan as "he who has bhagavatta"; meaning "he who has the quality of possessing all good qualities". The term is seldom used to refer to other forms of Krishna and Vishnu within the context of certain religious texts such as the Bhagavata Purana, and also within other sects of Vaishnavism.

The theological interpretation of  differs with each tradition and the literal translation of the term has been understood in several distinct ways. Translated from the Sanskrit language, the term literary means "Bhagavan Himself" or "directly Bhagavan". Others have translated it simply as "the Lord Himself".

Gaudiya Vaishnava tradition often translates it within its perspective as primeval Lord or original Personality of Godhead, but also considers the terms such as Supreme Personality of Godhead and Supreme God as an equivalent to the term Svayam Bhagavan, and may also choose to apply these terms to Vishnu, Narayana and many of their associated Avatars. It should be however noted that although it is usual to speak of Vishnu as the source of the avatars, this is only one of the names of god of Vaishnavism, who is also known as Narayana, Vasudeva and Krishna and behind each of those names there is a divine figure with attributed supremacy in Vaishnavism.

Krishnaism 

Within Hinduism, Krishna is worshiped from a variety of perspectives. Krishnaism is a tradition related to Vaishnavism wherein Krishna is considered Svayam Bhagavan, meaning 'God Himself', and this title is used exclusively to designate Krishna as the Supreme God. Krishnaite traditions of Hinduism consider him to be the source of all avatars, and the source of Vishnu himself, or to be the same as Narayana. As such, he is therefore regarded as Svayam Bhagavan.

In Gaudiya Vaishnava Krishna-centered theology, the title Svayam Bhagavan is used exclusively to designate Krishna. Krishna is recognized to be Svayam Bhagavan in the belief of Gaudiya Vaishnavism and Dvaita sub-school of Hindu philosophy, the Pushtimarg tradition, in the Nimbarka Sampradaya, where Krishna is accepted to be the source of all other avatars, and the source of Vishnu himself. Gaudiya Vaishnavas and followers of the Pushtimarg tradition and Nimbarka Sampradaya use the Gopala Tapani Upanishad, and the Bhagavata Purana, to support their view that Krishna is indeed the Svayam Bhagavan. This belief was summarized by the 16th century author Jiva Goswami in some of his works, such as Krishna-sandarbha.

Vaishnavism 
In other sub-traditions of Vaishnavism, Krishna is one of many aspects and avatars of Vishnu (Rama is another, for example), recognized and understood from an eclectic assortment of perspectives and viewpoints. Vaishnavism is one of the earliest single God focussed traditions that derives its heritage from the Vedas.

When followers of Vishnu-centered sampradayas of Vaishnavism describe Krishna as "Svayam Bhagavan" it refers to their belief that Krishna is among the highest and fullest of all Avatars and is considered to be the "paripurna Avatara", complete in all respects and the same as the original. According to them Krishna is described in the Bhagavata Purana as the Purnavatara (or complete manifestation) of the Bhagavan, while other incarnations are called partial.

In Sri Vaishnavism, Krishna is viewed as one of the many avatars of Narayana or Vishnu. The Sri Vaishnavism sub-tradition reveres goddess Lakshmi with god Vishnu as equivalent, and traces it roots its roots to the ancient Vedas and Pancaratra texts in Sanskrit.

See also 

 Hindu views on God and gender
 Prajapati
 Adi parashakti
 Soham (Sanskrit)
 Hiranyagarbha sukta
 Nasadiya sukta
 Names of God
 Conceptions of God
 God in Theosophy (Blavatskian)
 Arya Samaj
 ISKCON

Notes

References

Bibliography

External links 
The Idea of God in Hinduism, A. S. Woodburne (1925), The Journal of Religion
GRETIL etext: The transliterated Sanskrit text for the entire work – Bhagavata Purana (uni-goettingen.de)
Srimad Bhagavatam – glories, subjects, dating, concordance to Vedanta-sutra

 
Conceptions of God
Hindu theology
God